Sussexite is a manganese borate mineral MnBO2(OH). Crystals are monoclinic prismatic and typically fibrous in occurrence. Colour is white, pink, yellowish white with a pearly lustre. It has a Mohs hardness of 3 and a specific gravity of 3.12.

It is named after the Franklin Mining District in Sussex County, New Jersey, US where it was first discovered in 1868.

Sussexite also occurs in France, Italy, Namibia, North Korea, South Africa, Switzerland, and the US states of Michigan, New Jersey, Utah and Virginia.

References

External links

 Abandoned Mines of New Jersey

Manganese(II) minerals
Nesoborates
Monoclinic minerals
Minerals in space group 14
Minerals described in 1868